WMXH-FM (105.7 FM) is a Christian Adult Contemporary formatted broadcast radio station licensed to Luray, Virginia, serving Page County, Southern Shenandoah County and Northern Rockingham County, all in Virginia. WMXH-FM is owned and operated by Baker Family Stations, through licensee Positive Alternative Radio, Inc.

History
The station first launched on October 16, 1979 with the callsign WLCC as an Adult Contemporary format, branded as "106.3 WLCC" and was owned by the Luray Caverns Corporation.

In 1993 the FCC required WLCC to change the frequency to 105.7 to allow a new radio station licensed to Churchville, VA to use the 106.3 frequency.

On May 8, 1998, the station's format was segued to Hot Adult Contemporary.  On the same date, the station's callsign was changed to WMXH-FM, as well as its branding, to "Mix 105.7".  In mid-2002, WMXH-FM switched to an Adult Standards format, branded as "Stardust 105.7; The Music of Your Life". The station played hits from the 1940s through the 1960s. On June 4, 2014, WMXH-FM and sister station WRAA were sold to Hayden Hamilton Media Strategies for $325,000.  The sale was closed on October 1, 2014. On the night of October 24, 2014, WMXH-FM dropped its Adult Standards format and went silent until approximately 10:00 A.M. on December 18, 2014, when it returned on the air with a Classic Hits format branded as "Bright Radio 105-7; Sassy Soul; Fun Time Rock & Roll", playing hits from the 1960s through the 1990s.

On April 17, 2019, WMXH-FM began simulcasting WPER, Fredericksburg, VA. Hayden Hamilton Media Strategies sold WMXH-FM and WRAA to WPER owner Baker Family Stations effective December 19, 2019, for $165,000.

References

External links
 

Contemporary Christian radio stations in the United States
1979 establishments in Virginia
Radio stations established in 1979
MXH-FM